Regular television broadcasts in the United Kingdom started in 1936 as a public service which was free of advertising, which followed the first demonstration of a transmitted moving image in 1926. Currently, the United Kingdom has a collection of free-to-air, free-to-view and subscription services over a variety of distribution media, through which there are over 480 channels for consumers as well as on-demand content. There are six main channel owners who are responsible for most material viewed.

There are 27,000 hours of domestic content produced a year, at a cost of £2.6 billion. Since 24 October 2012, all television broadcasts in the United Kingdom have been in a digital format, following the end of analogue transmissions in Northern Ireland. Digital content is delivered via terrestrial, satellite and cable, as well as over IP. As of 2003, 53.2% of households watch through terrestrial, 31.3% through satellite, and 15.6% through cable.

The Royal Television Society (RTS) is a British-based educational charity for the discussion and analysis of television in all its forms, past, present, and future. It is the oldest television society in the world.

Broadcast television providers 
Free-to-air, free-to-view and subscription providers operate, with differences in the number of channels, capabilities such as the programme guide (EPG), video on demand (VOD), high-definition (HD), interactive television via the red button, and coverage across the UK.  All providers make available the UK's five most-watched channels: BBC One, BBC Two, ITV1, Channel 4 and Channel 5.

Broadcast television is distributed as radio waves via terrestrial or satellite transmissions, or as electrical or light signals through ground-based cables. In the UK, these use the Digital Video Broadcasting standard. Most TVs sold in the UK (as well as much of the rest of Europe) come with a DVB-T (terrestrial) tuner. Following the financial failure of digital terrestrial pay TV service ITV Digital in 2002, UK digital terrestrial TV services were rebranded as Freeview and do not require a subscription. Set-top boxes are generally used to receive channels from other providers. Most services have integrated their broadcast TV services with additional video streams distributed via the Internet, or through their own Internet Protocol network.

The Broadcasters' Audience Research Board publish quarterly statistics of the number of UK households per broadcast TV platform. Aggregating the statistics for Q1 2020 show that 56% subscribe to one or more broadcast TV services, vs 44% who receive free TV.

Digital terrestrial television 

The primary digital terrestrial TV service, Freeview, launched in 2002 and is free-of-charge to view.  It replaced the subscription service named ONdigital or ITV Digital, which ran from 1997 to 2002. Digital terrestrial television was itself the replacement for analogue terrestrial TV, which ran from 1936 to 2012.

, Freeview provides over seventy TV and radio channels, which are received via an aerial. It is operated by DTV Services Ltd., a joint venture between the BBC, ITV, Channel 4 and Sky. The transmitter network is predominately operated by Arqiva.

The TV channels are transmitted in bundles, called  multiplexes, and the available channels are dependent on how many multiplexes are transmitted in each area. The six national multiplexes are available to 90% of households from 92 transmitters; and three multiplexes are available to 9% of households from 1,067 transmitters.  In Northern Ireland, a multiplex carrying channels from the Republic of Ireland can reach 71% of Northern Irish households from 3 transmitters. Local TV and radio is available to 54% of households from an additional multiplex via 44 transmitters, and an extra multiplex is available to 54% of households in Greater Manchester.

Multiple vendors sell hybrid set-top-boxes or smart TVs which combine terrestrial channels with streamed (Internet TV) content. Internet-based TV services such as BBC iPlayer, ITVX and All 4 are available via the broadband connection of Freeview Play, Netgem and YouView receivers. These also support optional subscription services such as Netflix and Prime Video. BT TV and TalkTalk TV offer additional subscription services for their respective broadband customers using Netgem or YouView devices.  Netgem TV set-top-boxes combine Freeview Play with subscription channels, and are available directly or from several broadband suppliers.

Saorview, the terrestrial TV service in the Republic of Ireland which launched in 2011, can be received in parts of Northern Ireland via overspill transmissions.

Cable television 

Many regional companies developed cable-television services in the late 1980s and 1990s as licences for cable television were awarded on a city-by-city basis. The mid-1990s saw the companies start to merge and the turn of the century only three big companies remained. In 2007 Telewest and NTL merged, resulting in the formation of Virgin Media, which is available to 55% of households. Cable TV is a subscription service normally bundled with a phone line and broadband.

Satellite television 

There are two distinctly-marketed direct-broadcast satellite (DBS) services (also known as direct-to-home (DTH), to be distinguished from satellite signals intended for non-consumer reception).

Sky TV is a subscription service operated by Sky Ltd, owned by Comcast, which launched in 1998 as SkyDigital.  Compared to the previous analogue service which had launched in 1989, it provided more channels, widescreen, interactive TV and a near video-on-demand service using staggered start times for pay-per-view content. Innovations since have included high definition, 3D TV, a digital video recorder, the ability to view recordings on other devices, remote operation via the Internet to add recordings, and on-demand content via the satellite-receiver's broadband connection of both Sky and third-party TV. The Sky subscription also includes access to Sky Go, which allows mobile devices and computers to access subscription content via the Internet.

Freesat is a free satellite-service developed jointly by the BBC and ITV. In contrast to Freesat from Sky, it does not need a viewing card. Like Sky, it provides high-definition content, digital recording and video-on-demand via the broadband connection.  The on-screen programme guide lists the available channels, rather than encrypted channels which need a subscription to view.

Freesat and Sky TV transmit from SES Astra satellites at 28.2° east (Astra 2E/2F/2G). As the satellites are in geostationary orbit, they are positioned above the earth's equator approximately 35,786 km above sea level; this places them above the Democratic Republic of the Congo.

Internet video services 

TV via the Internet can be streamed or downloaded, and consist of amateur or professionally produced content.  In the UK, most broadcasters provide catch-up TV services which allow viewing of TV for a window after it was broadcast.  Online video can be viewed via mobile devices, computers, TVs equipped with a built in Internet connection, or TVs connected to an external set-top-box, streaming stick or games console.  Most of the broadcast TV providers have integrated their set-top-boxes with Internet video to provide a hybrid broadcast and online service.

Catch-up services 

Since 2006, UK channel owners and content producers have been creating Internet services to access their programmes. Often, these are available for a window after the broadcast schedule.  These services generally block users outside of the UK.

Online video services for professionally produced content 

There are numerous online services targeting the UK, offering a combination of subscription, rental and purchase options for viewing online TV.  Most are available via any Internet connection, however some require a specific broadband connection. Some services sell 3rd party services, such as Amazon's Prime Video.

BARB tracks the number of households subscribing to Netflix, Prime Video and Now, referred to as SVOD households. Their statistics for Q1 2020 show that 53% of households subscribe to at least one of these, and 24% to at least two.  Netflix has 13.01 million subscribers, Prime Video (Amazon) has 7.86 million, and Now has 1.62 million, according to BARB's figures for Q1 2020.  BARB's equivalent figures for broadcast TV show that 56% of households subscribe.

The table following summarises some of the available Internet TV services in the UK. For brevity, it does not include catch-up-only or amateur-only services, individual channels, distributors of illegal or adult content, services which solely redistribute free broadcast channels, portals, or services which don't target the UK. 'Free' refers to free at the point of consumption, not including fees for Internet connectivity or a TV licence.

Other international streaming services with pricing in GBP include: Acorn TV, Arrow, BKTV, Crunchyroll, Dekkoo, Demand Africa, Docsville, Funimation Now, GuideDoc, Hayu, Hoichoi, Hotstar, iQiyi, iWantTFC, Mubi, NewsPlayer+, Revry, Shudder, Starz, True Story, WOW Presents Plus and ZEE5.

Channels and channel owners

Viewing statistics

Most viewed channels 
The Broadcasters' Audience Research Board (BARB) measures television ratings in the UK. As of 2 January 2022, the average daily viewing time per home was 3 hours 8 minutes (of BARB-reported channels, includes broadcast and Internet viewings). 15 channels have a 4-week share of ≥ 1.0%.

Most viewed broadcaster groups 

, there are 10 broadcaster groups with a four week share of ≥ 1.0% (although BARB reports sub-groups of BBC and Paramount individually, and it's unclear what the 'ITV' group refers to).

BBC and UKTV 

The British Broadcasting Corporation (BBC) is the world's oldest and largest broadcaster, and is the country's principal public service broadcaster of radio and television. BBC Television is funded primarily by a television licence and from sales of its programming to overseas markets. It does not carry advertising. The licence fee is levied on all households that watch or record TV as it is broadcast and the fee is determined by periodic negotiation between the government and the BBC.

Its first analogue terrestrial channel was launched by the BBC Television Service in 1936. It rebranded to BBC1 in 1964 following the launch of BBC2, the UK's third analogue terrestrial channel after ITV. BBC News 24 launched as an analogue cable channel in 1997, later rebranding to BBC News in 2008. BBC Parliament, which was originally an analogue cable channel known as The Parliamentary Channel, was acquired by the BBC in 1998.  From 1998 onwards the BBC started digital TV transmissions, launching new channels and broadcasting via satellite in addition to terrestrial and cable.

The BBC's Internet-based service iPlayer contains content from the BBC's TV channels, the Welsh-language public-service broadcaster S4C, as well as videos created from BBC radio programmes.

UKTV is a commercial broadcaster owned by BBC Studios, one of the BBC's commercial units. Originating in 1992 with UK Gold, UKTV expanded its channels from 1997 onwards, with the BBC taking full ownership in June 2019. Unlike the BBC's public service channels, the UKTV channels contain advertising.

ITV 

ITV, branded as ITV1 or STV, is the network of fourteen regional and one national commercial television franchise, founded in 1955 to provide competition to the BBC. ITV was the country's first commercial television provider funded by advertisements. Each region was originally independent and used its own on-air identity. Through a series of mergers, takeovers and relaxation of regulation, thirteen of the franchises are now held by ITV plc, and the remaining two by STV Group. Since 2012, ITV plc produces the network nationally, with STV Group acting as an affiliate.

STV Group uses the channel name of STV for its two franchises in Scotland. ITV plc names the channel UTV in Northern Ireland, and ITV1 for the remaining regions, although UTV has used ITV or ITV1 branding since April 2020. The national breakfast-time franchise is held by ITV plc, which appears as an indistinguishable programming block across the network. Legally, the network has been known as Channel 3 since 1990, which is the name Ofcom uses.

Since 1998, ITV plc has operated additional free or subscription channels, starting with ITV2.

Channel 4 

Launched in 1982, Channel 4 is a state-owned national broadcaster which is funded by its commercial activities (including advertising). Channel 4 has expanded greatly after gaining greater independence from the IBA, especially in the multi-channel digital world launching E4, Film4, More4, 4Music, 4seven and various timeshift services. Since 2005, it has been a member of the Freeview consortium, and operates one of the six digital terrestrial multiplexes with ITV as Digital 3&4. Since the advent of digital television, Channel 4 is now also broadcast in Wales across all digital platforms. Channel 4 was the first British channel not to carry regional variations for programming, however it does have six set advertising regions.

With Bauer Media Group, Channel 4 jointly owns a range of music channels under the Box Plus Network banner.

Sky 

Sky is a European broadcaster owned by global American media conglomerate Comcast.   Sky Television launched in 1989, with a 4-channel service received via satellite.  The channels at launch were Sky Channel, Sky News, Sky Movies and Eurosport. They were initially free to receive, and Sky Movies was the first to move to a subscription early in 1990. Sky News was the UK's first dedicated news channel. The new service was the UK's first consumer satellite TV service, beating rival BSB, with which Sky would later merge to become BSkyB.  Sky's satellite service grew to become a subscription platform through which Sky offer their own channels, pay-per-view services and channels from other broadcasters. Sky's digital platform launched in 1998, with the original analogue service closing in 2001. Sky was acquired by Comcast in 2018.

Since 2012, Sky operate Now, an Internet TV streaming service offering subscriptions without a fixed-term contract.

Sky's channel portfolio has grown greatly since the launch of digital TV.  Sky make their channels available via rival cable and Internet services as well as their own satellite service and Now.

Paramount Global 

Channel 5 was the fifth analogue terrestrial channel to launch, in March 1997. Due to constraints with the available UHF frequencies at the time, many households had to retune their video recorders, which shared the frequency on their RF output with the frequency used by Channel 5's new broadcasts. Channel 5 was the first terrestrial channel to also broadcast via satellite. From 2006 onwards, Channel 5 launched new digital channels and an Internet on-demand service. After changing ownership several times, in May 2014 Channel 5 and its sister channels were acquired by Viacom, an American media conglomerate, known as Paramount since 2022.

By the time it acquired Channel 5, Paramount already operated a large number of subscription channels in the UK, including the MTV, Nickelodeon and Comedy Central channels, which are available via Sky TV, Virgin Media and Now. In terms of viewing share, the combined viewing across Paramount's channels make the group the UK's fifth largest broadcaster, according to BARB's viewing figures for 1 March 2020.

Paramount additionally operates the Pluto TV and Paramount+ Internet streaming services.

Local and regional television

Local television 

Since 2012, additional local TV channels are available via Freeview channel 7 or 8. The channels are licensed by Ofcom, with 34 local TV channels licensed as of 2 July 2020.  Nineteen of the licenses are held by That's TV, and eight are held by Made Television. The remainder are held independently. Each license contains the amount of local TV programming required. As an example, the license for Scarborough, which is held by That's TV, requires seven hours of local programming per week (one hour per day on average). Thirteen additional licenses were originally intended, but Ofcom decided not to advertise these in June 2018.

The way Ofcom structured local television – being dependent on terrestrial transmission – was criticised in a Guardian article in 2015 for being "years behind in its thinking", as it does not account for the Internet. In the article, Ofcom responded that the licensing scheme was inherited from the Department for Digital, Culture, Media and Sport. In April 2018, BBC News reported that "many of the stations have been ridiculed for the poor quality of their output or have been reported to Ofcom for breaching broadcasting rules". The local TV companies receive a subsidy from the BBC of £147.50 per local news story, funded by the license fee, paid whether the BBC uses the content or not. A June 2018 article on BuzzFeed claimed that That's TV was created "primarily to extract money from the BBC whilst delivering little content of useful value".

Regional television 

BBC One, BBC Two and the ITV network (comprising ITV1 and STV) are split into regions in which regional news and other programming is broadcast. ITV1/STV is split into fourteen geographic licencees, with several of these split into two or three sub-regions, resulting in a greater total number of regional news programmes. Ofcom sets a quota for the BBC and ITV on the amount of regional programming required.

Advertising on ITV1/STV and Channel 4 is regional. Channel 4 is split into 6 advertising regions, but has no regional programming.

Country-specific channels 

BBC Scotland and the Gaelic-language channel BBC Alba target Scotland, and the Welsh-language channel S4C targets Wales. In Northern Ireland, channels originating in the Republic of Ireland are available, including RTÉ One, RTÉ2 and the Irish-language TG4.

Programming 

British television differs from other countries, such as the United States, in as much that programmes produced in the United Kingdom do not generally have a long season run of around 20 weeks. Instead, they are produced in a series, a set of episodes varying in length, usually aired over a period of a few months. See List of British television series.

100 Greatest British Television Programmes 

100 Greatest British Television Programmes was a list compiled in 2000 by the British Film Institute (BFI), chosen by a poll of industry professionals, to determine what were the greatest British television programmes of any genre ever to have been screened. Although not including any programmes made in 2000 or later, the list is useful as an indication of what were generally regarded as the most successful British programmes of the 20th century. The top 10 programmes are:

100 Greatest TV Moments 

100 Greatest TV Moments was a list compiled by Channel 4 in 1999. The top 10 entries are:

List of most watched television broadcasts 

The majority of special events attracting large audiences are often carried on more than one channel. The most-watched programme of all time on a single channel is the 1973 wedding ceremony of The Princess Anne, shown only on BBC1. The figures in these tables represent the average viewership achieved by each broadcast during its run-time and do not include peak viewership.
 Post-1981 figures verified by the Broadcasters' Audience Research Board (BARB)
 Pre-1981 figures supplied by the British Film Institute (BFI)

Notes:
 The Wedding of Princess Margaret and Lord Snowdon (6 May 1960) was watched by an estimated 25 million viewers in Britain.
 At least two Muhammad Ali boxing matches were reported to have been watched by at least 26million viewers in the United Kingdom: the Fight of the Century (Ali vs. Frazier) was reported to have been watched by 27.5million British viewers in 1971, and The Rumble in the Jungle (Ali vs. Foreman) was reported to have been watched by 26million viewers on BBC1 in 1974.
 Live Aid is reported to have reached approximately 24.5million British viewers in July 1985.
 The Wedding of Prince William and Catherine Middleton (29 April 2011) received a total audience peak of 26 million viewers, but this is a combined figure aggregated from the ten different channels that broadcast the ceremony. The highest figures of these were 13.59 million on BBC1, with an extra 4.02 million watching on ITV.

Genre lists

100 Greatest Kids' TV shows 
The 100 Greatest Kids' TV shows was a poll conducted by the British television channel Channel 4 in 2001. The top 5 UK-produced programmes are:

British Academy Television Award for Best Drama Series 

The British Academy Television Award for Best Drama Series is one of the major categories of the British Academy Television Awards. The last 5 winners are:
 2022: In My Skin – Expectation Entertainment / BBC Three
 2021: Save Me Too – World Productions / Sky Atlantic
 2020: The End of the F***ing World – Clerkenwell Films / Channel 4
 2019: Killing Eve – Sid Gentle Films / BBC One
 2018: Peaky Blinders – Tiger Aspect Productions / BBC Two

Terrestrial channel programming

Weekday 

Weekday programming on terrestrial channels begins at 6 am with breakfast national news programmes (along with regional news updates) on BBC Breakfast on BBC One and Good Morning Britain on ITV, with Channel 5 showing children's programmes under the Milkshake! brand. Channel 4 predominately broadcasts comedy programmes such as Everybody Loves Raymond in its morning slot. The weekday breakfast news programme ends at 9:15am on BBC One and 9am on ITV.

Following this on BBC One, lifestyle programming is generally shown, including property, auction and home and gardening. BBC One continues this genre until after the lunchtime news, whereby afternoon has a soap called Doctors followed by dramas. BBC Two airs the BBC News updates and political programming between 9 am and 1 pm. Channel 4 often shows home-project and archaeology lifestyle programming in the early afternoon after a Channel 4 News summary. Channel 5 broadcasts chat show programmes in the morning including Jeremy Vine with regular news bulletins. In the afternoon, it shows dramas followed by an hour of Australian soaps such as Home and Away and Neighbours and films.

News bulletins are broadcast between 6 pm and 7 pm on both BBC One and ITV, with BBC One beginning with the national BBC News at Six and ITV with the flagship regional news programme. At around 6:30 pm, BBC One broadcasts the regional news programmes whilst ITV broadcasts the ITV Evening News. Channel 4 News starts at 7 pm and 5 News broadcasts for an hour at 5 pm.

Primetime programming is usually dominated by further soaps, including EastEnders on BBC One, Coronation Street and Emmerdale on ITV, and Hollyoaks on Channel 4. These soap operas or 'continuing dramas' as they are now called can vary throughout the year, however weekly dramas, such as Holby City, are also fixed to scheduling. BBC Two broadcasts factual programming, including lifestyle and documentaries. BBC Four begins programming at 7pm. The channel shows a wide variety of programmes including arts, documentaries, music, international film, comedy, original programmes, drama and current affairs. It is required by its licence to air at least 100 hours of new arts and music programmes, 110 hours of new factual programmes and to premiere 20 foreign films each year. BBC One, BBC Two, ITV, Channel 4 and Channel 5 broadcast dramas and documentaries in the evenings. At 10pm with the flagship national news on BBC One in BBC News at Ten (followed by Newsnight on BBC Two) and on ITV on ITV News at Ten followed by the regional late night news. Because of this, the UK can often rely more heavily on TV guides, be it with the newspaper, online, via information services on the television such as the BBC Red Button service or the built in Electronic Programme Guides.

Weekend 

Weekend daytime programming traditionally consists of more lifestyle programming plus films and live and recorded coverage of sporting events on most weekend afternoons. There are further battles for viewers in the weekend primetime slot, often featuring documentaries and game shows in the evening. Lunchtime, early evening and late evening news programmes continue on BBC One and ITV although the length of the bulletins are shorter than during the week. Sunday night schedules usually consist of dramas, light entertainment, documentaries, films, music concerts, festivals or sporting events.

Cultural impact

Christian morality 

In 1963 Mary Whitehouse, incensed by the liberalising policies followed by Sir Hugh Greene, then director general of the BBC, began her letter writing campaign. She subsequently launched the Clean Up TV Campaign, and founded the National Viewers' and Listeners' Association in 1965. In 2008, Toby Young in an article for The Independent wrote: "On the wider question of whether sex and violence on TV has led to a general moral collapse in society at large, the jury is still out. No one doubts that Western civilization is teetering on the brink ... but it is unfair to lay the blame entirely at the feet of BBC2 and Channel 4."

In 2005, the BBC's broadcast of Jerry Springer: The Opera elicited 55,000 complaints, and provoked protests from Christian organisation Christian Voice, and a private prosecution against the BBC by the Christian Institute. A summons was not issued.

Awards 

The British Academy Television Awards are the most prestigious awards given in the British television industry, analogous to the Emmy Awards in the United States. They have been awarded annually since 1954, and are only open to British programmes. After all the entries have been received, they are voted for online by all eligible members of the Academy. The winner is chosen from the four nominees by a special jury of nine academy members for each award, the members of each jury selected by the Academy's Television Committee.

The National Television Awards is a British television awards ceremony, sponsored by ITV and initiated in 1995. Although not widely held to be as prestigious as the BAFTAs, the National Television Awards are probably the most prominent ceremony for which the results are voted on by the general public. Unlike the BAFTAs, the National Television Awards allow foreign programmes to be nominated, providing they have been screened on a British channel during the eligible time period.

Regulation 

Ofcom is the independent regulator and competition authority for the communication industries in the United Kingdom, including television. As the regulatory body for media broadcasts, Ofcom's duties include:
 Specification of the Broadcast Code, which took effect on 25 July 2005, with the latest version being published October 2008. The Code itself is published on Ofcom's website, and provides a mandatory set of rules which broadcast programmes must comply with. The 10 main sections cover protection of under-eighteens, harm and offence, crime, religion, impartiality and accuracy, elections, fairness, privacy, sponsorship and commercial references. As stipulated in the Communications Act 2003, Ofcom enforces adherence to the Code. Failure for a broadcaster to comply with the Code results in warnings, fines, and potentially revokation of a broadcasting licence.
 Rules on the amount and distribution of advertising, which also took effect July 2005
 Examining specific complaints by viewers or other bodies about programmes and sponsorship. Ofcom issues Broadcast Bulletins on a fortnightly basis which are accessible via its web site. As an example, a bulletin from February 2009 has a complaint from the National Heart Forum over sponsorship of The Simpsons by Domino's Pizza on Sky One. Ofcom concluded this was in breach of the Broadcast Code, since it contravened an advertising restriction of food high in fat, salt or sugar. (Restrictions in food and drink advertising to children were introduced in November 2006.)
 The management, regulation and assignment of the electromagnetic spectrum in the UK, and licensing of portions of the spectrum for television broadcasting
 Public consultations on matters relating to TV broadcasting. The results of the consultations are published by Ofcom, and inform the policies that Ofcom creates and enforces.

In 2008, Ofcom issued fines to the total of £7.7m. This included £5.67m of fines to ITV companies, including a £3m fine to LWT over voting irregularities on Saturday Night Takeaway, and fines totalling £495,000 to the BBC. Ofcom said phone-in scandals had contributed significantly to the fine totals.

The Committee for Advertising Practice (CAP, or BCAP) is the body contracted by Ofcom to create and maintain the codes of practice governing television advertising. The Broadcast Advertising Codes (or the TV codes) are accessible on CAP's web site. The Codes cover advertising standards (the TV Code), guidance notes, scheduling rules, text services (the Teletext Code) and interactive television guidance. The main sections of the TV Code concern compliance, programmes and advertising, unacceptable products, political and controversial issues, misleading advertising, harm and offence, children, medicines, treatments, health claims and nutrition, finance and investments, and religion.

The Advertising Standards Authority is an independent body responsible for resolving complaints relating to the advertising industry within the UK. It is not government funded, but funded by a levy on the advertising industry. It ensures compliance with the Codes created by CAP. The ASA covers all forms of advertising, not just television advertisements. The ASA can refer problematic adverts to Ofcom, since the channels carrying the adverts are ultimately responsible for the advertising content, and are answerable to Ofcom. Ofcom can issue fines or revoke broadcast licences if necessary.

Licensing 

In the United Kingdom and the Crown dependencies, a television licence is required to receive any publicly broadcast television service, or for using BBC iPlayer. This includes the commercial channels, cable and satellite transmissions, Internet-streamed channels, and applies regardless of the technology used to view. The money from the licence fee is used to provide radio, television and Internet content for the BBC, Welsh-language television programmes for S4C, monitoring of global mass media, nine orchestras and performing groups, technical research, and contributions to broadband roll out. The fee is classified as a hypothecated tax rather than a subscription. The BBC gives the following figures for expenditure of licence fee income per month in 2021/2022:

Production 

As of 2002, 27,000 hours of original programming are produced year in the UK television industry, excluding news, at a cost of £2.6bn. Ofcom has determined that 56% (£1.5bn) of production is in-house by the channel owners, and the remainder by independent production companies. Ofcom is enforcing a 25% independent production quota for the channel operators, as stipulated in the Broadcasting Act 1990.

In-house production 

ITV plc, the company which owns 12 of the 15 regional ITV franchises, has set its production arm ITV Studios a target of producing 75% of the ITV schedule, the maximum allowed by Ofcom. This would be a rise from 54% at present, as part of a strategy to make ITV content-led chiefly to double production revenues to £1.2bn by 2012. ITV Studios currently produces programmes such as Coronation Street, Emmerdale and Heartbeat.

In contrast, the BBC has implemented a Window of Creative Competition (WOCC), a 25% proportion over and above the 25% Ofcom quota in which the BBC's in-house production and independent producers can compete. The BBC produces shows such as All Creatures Great and Small and F***off I'm a Hairy Woman.

Channel 4 commissions all programmes from independent producers.

Independent production 

As a consequence of the launch of Channel 4 in 1982, and the 25% independent quota from the Broadcasting Act 1990, an independent production sector has grown in the UK. Notable companies include Talkback Thames, Endemol UK, Hat Trick Productions, and Tiger Aspect Productions. A full list can be seen here: :Category:Television production companies of the United Kingdom

History

Timeline

Closed and aborted television providers 

The following Internet TV services have closed:

The following services were aborted before launch:
 Sky Picnic, a proposed subscription digital terrestrial service from Sky in 2007
 'Project Kangaroo', an Internet TV service announced by the BBC, ITV and Channel 4 in 2007. Some of the technology was reused in SeeSaw.  A similar concept later launched as BritBox.

Analogue terrestrial television 

Analogue TV was transmitted via VHF (1936) and later UHF (1964) radio waves, with analogue broadcasts ending in 2012.

VHF transmissions started in 1936 and closed in 1985 (with a gap 1939–1946), carrying two channels.  The launch channel was the BBC Television Service, known as BBC 1 since 1964. This was joined by Independent Television, a network of regional franchises launching between 1955 and 1962. The channels transmitted in monochrome using the 405-line television system at 25 frames per second, initially with an aspect ratio of 5:4, switching to 4:3 in 1950.

UHF transmissions started in 1964 and closed in 2012.  The launch channel was BBC 2. This would be joined by BBC 1, the ITV network, Channel 4 or S4C in Wales, Channel 5 as well as a network of local TV channels. Transmissions started using the System I standard, a 625-line monochrome picture at 25 frames/second (576i) and a 4:3 aspect ratio.  Technical advancements included colour (1967), teletext (1974), and stereo sound (1991).  The drive to switch viewers from analogue to digital transmissions was a process called the digital switchover.

Whilst there are no longer any analogue broadcasts in the UK, a PAL signal may be present in closed RF distribution systems, e.g. a video feed from an intercom in a block of flats, or a security system.

Defunct channels 

There are nearly 200 defunct British channels. For a list, see List of former TV channels in the UK or :Category:Defunct television channels in the United Kingdom.

Commentary

The rise of television in the UK 

The British Broadcasting Corporation (BBC) was established in 1927 to develop radio broadcasting, and inevitably became involved in TV in 1936. The BBC is funded by income from a "Broadcast Receiving Licence" purchased by UK residents. The cost of this is set by agreement with the UK Government.

Television caught on in the United Kingdom in 1947, but its expansion was slow. By 1951, with only two transmitters, near London and Birmingham, only 9% of British homes owned a television set. The United Kingdom was the first country in the world to have a regular daily television schedule direct to homes, and it was the first to have technical professions to work on TVs.

Up until 1972, television broadcasting hours were tightly regulated by the British government, under the control of the Postmaster General. Before the launch of the commercial channel ITV in 1955, the BBC was restricted by law to just five hours maximum of television in a day. This was increased at the launch of the commercial channel ITV to a 7-hour broadcasting day for both channels. Gradually the number of hours were increased. Typically, during the late 1960s, the law regulated a 50-hour broadcasting week for all television channels in the UK. This that meant BBC1, BBC2 and ITV could only broadcast normal programming for 7 hours a day from Mondays to Fridays, and 7.5 hours a day on Saturdays and Sundays.

Until 1957, television in the United Kingdom could not air from 6.00pm to 7.00pm. This was called the "Toddlers' Truce", in which the idea was that parents could put their children to bed before primetime television would commence; this restriction was lifted in 1957. However, on Sundays, television remained off the air from 6.00pm to 7.00pm. This was in response to religious leaders' fears that television would interfere with people attending church services. In 1958, a compromise was reached, in which only religious programming could be aired during this time slot. The restriction was lifted in January 1972.

The Postmaster General allowed exemptions to the regulations.  All schools programming, adult education, religious programming, state occasions, political broadcasts and Welsh language programming were totally exempt from the restrictions.  Sport and outside broadcasting events were given a separate quota of broadcasting hours which could be used in a year, starting off at 200 hours a year in the mid 1950s, rising to a quota of 350 hours a year by the late 1960s. Broadcasting on Christmas Eve, Christmas Day, Boxing Day, New Year's Eve and New Year's Day was also exempt from the tightly controlled restrictions.

The election of a Conservative government in June 1970 brought in changes to the control of broadcasting hours. At first, the typical broadcasting day was extended to 8 hours a day, with an increase in exemptions over Christmas, and an increase in the sport/outside broadcasting quota. On 19 January 1972, the then Minister for Posts and Telecommunications, Christopher Chataway, announced to the British House of Commons that all restrictions on broadcasting hours on television would be lifted from that day, with the broadcasters allowed to set their own broadcasting hours from then on. By November 1972, a full daytime schedule had been launched on ITV from 9.30am each day, with the BBC also expanding their schedules to include more daytime programming.

The UK Government previously appointed people to the BBC's Board of Governors, a body responsible for the general direction of the organisation, and appointment of senior executives, but not its day-to-day management. From 2007, the BBC Trust replaced the Board of Governors. It is operationally independent of BBC management and external bodies, and aims to act in the best interests of licence fee payers.

Commercial television was first introduced in the United Kingdom in 1955. Unlike the US, there was a distinct split between advertisements and programming. Advertisers purely purchased spots within pre-defined breaks within programming, and had no connection to the programme content. The content and nature of adverts was strictly controlled by the ITA, the body controlling commercial television.

History of satellite television 
The first commercial direct-broadcast satellite (DBS, also known as direct-to-home) service in the United Kingdom, Sky Television, was launched in 1989 and used the newly launched Astra satellite at 19.2° east, providing four analogue TV channels. The channels and subsequent VideoCrypt video encryption system used the existing PAL broadcast standard, unlike the winner of the UK state DBS licence, British Satellite Broadcasting (BSB).

In 1990, BSB launched, broadcasting five channels (Now, Galaxy, The Movie Channel, The Power Station and The Sports Channel) in D-MAC format and using the EuroCypher video encryption system which was derived from the General Instruments VideoCipher system used in the USA. One of the main selling points of the BSB offering was the Squarial, a flat plate antenna and low-noise block converter (LNB). Sky's system used conventional and cheaper dish and LNB technology.

The two companies competed over the UK rights to movies. Sky operated from an industrial park in Isleworth in West London, whereas BSB had newly built offices in London (Marco Polo House). The two services subsequently merged to form British Sky Broadcasting (BSkyB). BSB's D-MAC/EuroCypher system was gradually replaced with Sky's VideoCrypt video encryption system.

In 1994, 17% of the group was floated on the London Stock Exchange (with ADRs listed on the New York Stock Exchange), and Rupert Murdoch's News Corporation owns a 35% stake.

By 1998, following the launch of several more satellites to Astra's 19.2° east position, the number of channels had increased to around 60 and BSkyB launched the first subscription-based digital television platform in the UK, offering a range of 300 channels broadcast from Astra's new satellite, at 28.2° east position under the brand name Sky Digital. BSkyB's analogue service has now been discontinued, with all customers having been migrated to Sky Digital.

In May 2008, a free-to-air satellite service from the BBC and ITV was launched under the brand name Freesat, carrying a variety of channels from Astra 28.2°E, including some content in HD formats.

See also

Industry bodies 
 Broadcasting, Entertainment, Cinematograph and Theatre Union (BECTU), National Union of Journalists (NUJ) and Equity, trade unions for members of the broadcasting industry
 Clearcast, performs clearance of television advertising copy and the final advertisements. Replaced the Broadcast Advertising Clearance Centre (BACC) on 1 January 2008
 Culture, Media and Sport Select Committee, a select committee of the House of Commons of the United Kingdom, established in 1997, which oversees the Department for Culture, Media and Sport (DCMS), the government department responsible for broadcasting in the UK
 Digital TV Group (DTG), an industry association for digital television, formed in 1995
 Digital UK, the body in charge of digital switchover of television in the UK
 Producers Association for Cinema and Television
 Royal Television Society (RTS), a society for the discussion, analysis and preservation of television in all its forms, past, present and future, which formed in 1927
 United Kingdom Independent Broadcasting (UKIB), an affiliation of independent production companies and broadcasters, representing non-BBC interests in the European Broadcasting Union

Genres and programming 
 Ofcom Code on Sports and Other Listed and Designated Events, regulatory rules devised in 1997 which ensure particular sporting events are available for free via terrestrial television
 Sports broadcasting contracts in the United Kingdom
 British sitcom
 Light entertainment
 :Category:British television-related lists
 List of American television series based on British television series
 List of British television programmes based on American television series
 List of films based on British television series
 List of films based on British sitcoms
 List of BBC Radio programmes adapted for television, and of television programmes adapted for radio
 List of UK game shows
 List of longest-running UK television series

Miscellaneous 
 Appreciation Index (AI), a score between 0 and 100 which measures the public's approval of a particular programme, which can be used to measure attitudes to programmes with small or niche audiences
 Broadcast, a weekly trade magazine for the broadcast industry
 Edinburgh International Television Festival, an annual industry gathering in Edinburgh
 Public service broadcasting in the United Kingdom, broadcasting intended for public benefit rather than purely commercial concerns
 Public information film, government commissioned short films usually shown during television advertising breaks
 Listings and general television magazines Radio Times, Soaplife, TV & Satellite Week, TV easy, TV Quick, TVTimes, What's on TV

Notes

References

External links 
 
 The BFI TV 100 at the BFI website
 BBC News coverage
 British TV News

 
British television-related lists
Cultural history of the United Kingdom
Telecommunications-related introductions in 1936